Mastana is a 1970 Bollywood comedy film directed by Adurthi Subba Rao. The film stars Mehmood and Vinod Khanna. The film is remake of the Telugu film Sattekalapu Satteya (1969), directed by K. Balachander, starring Chalam and which was remade in Tamil in 1970 as Patham Pasali starring Nagesh and in Kannada in 1980 as Manku Thimma by Dwarakish.

Cast 
Mehmood as  Satya / Mastana
Padmini as Gauri
Vinod Khanna as Inspector Prasad
Bharathi as Sharda 
Rehman as Dhanraj
Shyama as Mrs. Dhanraj
Bobby as Naintara
Mukri as Dhanraj's Chauffeur
Leela Mishra as Nani
Manorama as Mrs. Rosa Daniels
Ramesh Deo as Jaggu
Kamal Kapoor as Jaggu's Boss
Hema Malini as Guest Appearance

Soundtrack

External links 
 

1970 films
1970s Hindi-language films
1970 comedy films
Hindi remakes of Telugu films
Films scored by Laxmikant–Pyarelal
Films directed by Adurthi Subba Rao
Hindi films remade in other languages